Jean-Antoine-Siméon Fort (28 August 1793 – 24 December 1861) was a French artist who painted in both oil and water colours. The French King Louis-Philippe commissioned several of his works.

Biography
In 1842, Fort exhibited four canvases of battles and sieges at the Salon. They had been ordered by King Louis-Philippe for the "musée historique de Versailles". In the following year, he was commissioned to produce a view of the royal residence (View of the Palace of Compiègne (1843)).

References

1793 births
1861 deaths
19th-century French painters
French male painters
French watercolourists
19th-century French male artists
18th-century French male artists